Podoserpula pusio, commonly known as the pagoda fungus, is a species of fungus in the family Amylocorticiaceae. It is the type species of the genus Podoserpula.

References

External links

Amylocorticiales
Fungi described in 1859
Fungi of Australia
Fungi of New Zealand
Fungi of South America
Taxa named by Miles Joseph Berkeley